Vladimir Davidovich Medem, né Grinberg (30 July 1879 in Liepāja, Russian Empire – 9 January 1923 in New York City), was a Russian Jewish politician and ideologue of the Jewish Labour Bund. The Medem Library in Paris, the largest European Yiddish institution, bears his name.

Life 
Son of a Russian medical officer who had converted from Judaism to Lutheranism, Vladimir Medem was educated in a Minsk gymnasium. He studied later at the Kiev University and developed an interest in the Yiddish-speaking proletariat and their harsh living conditions. He was preoccupied by the fact that the Russian Jews had no nation and no right to strike. In spite of his interest in Jewish affairs, Medem did not re-convert to Judaism.

Medem only learned Yiddish at the age of 22; the language was taboo in his family environment. Because of a student strike in 1899, he had to leave the university, and at that time, inspired by Marxist friends, he joined the Minsk socialists. His great interest in the world of Yiddish-speaking workers, and in the problem of political antisemitism, drew him to become active in the Jewish Labour Bund. Founded in 1897 in Vilna (Vilnius, Lithuania), in the Russian Empire, in 1918 the Bund (whose supporters were known as Bundists) was reestablished as a separate party in newly independent Poland, where Medem became its leading theorist. 

Medem emigrated to the United States in 1921, arriving in New York in mid January; in the U.S. he served as a representative of the Bund in Poland.  He died in New York less than two years later, on 9 January 1923. He is buried at Mount Carmel Cemetery in Queens, NY.

Influence and legacy 
The Jewish Labour Bund was committed to the cultural and national rights of Jews in Eastern Europe. In this regard, Medem dared to oppose the view of Russian Marxists, and even of Lenin. These objectives received support in Central and Western Europe, e.g. from Austromarxists, and especially in several Jewish immigrant workers' clubs in Paris, whose members described themselves as Bundists. One such club, which also saw the education of the workers as its main task was given the name Arbeter-klub afn nomen Vladimir Medem (Workers' Club on behalf of Vladimir Medem).

Main writings 
 1904: Social Democracy and the National Question
 1916: The doctrine of the Bund
 1938 (posthumous):  (Hg. Gros, Naftole; Gros, Naftoli). Verlag Kinder-Ring, 87 S., illustrated; reedited by National Yiddish Book Center, Amherst, Mass. (USA) 1999. Collection: "Steven Spielberg digital Yiddish library" No. 06827

See also
National personal autonomy

References

External links 
 
 YIVO Encyclopedia of East European Jewry
 A photo of the graves of Vladimir Medem, Sholem Aleichem, Morris Rosenfeld and others at the Mt Carmel Cemetery: 
 

1879 births
1923 deaths
Politicians from Minsk
People from Courland Governorate
Latvian Jews
Bundists
Latvian emigrants to the United States